Villeneuve-lès-Bouloc (literally Villeneuve near Bouloc) is a commune in the Haute-Garonne department in southwestern France.

Population

Sights 
 The Château de Villefranche is a castle and stately home which is listed as a historic site by the French Ministry of Culture.
 The church

See also
Communes of the Haute-Garonne department

References

Communes of Haute-Garonne